West Irving station is a Trinity Railway Express commuter rail and bus station in Irving, Texas. It is located at Jackson Street near Esters Road and served Irving Mall with connecting bus service to Las Colinas and North Lake College. It opened on November 13, 2000. Unlike many rail stations, West Irving does not have an indoor heating/cooling facility, nor does it have a station attendant. However, it does have passenger shelters for bus and TRE riders.

After the DART bus network redesign effective January 24, 2022, the rail station no longer has any bus service.

References

External links
 TRE - West Irving Station
 DART - Dallas Area Rapid Transit

Trinity Railway Express stations
West Irving (TRE station)
Railway stations in the United States opened in 2000
Railway stations in Dallas County, Texas
Transportation in Irving, Texas